Chen Baochen (1848–1935), was a Chinese official during late Qing era, hailing from Fuzhou, Fujian province in southeast/coastal China. During the last years of the Qing dynasty, he served as sub-chancellor in the Grand Secretariat and as vice minister of the Ministry of Rites (礼部侍郎). Following the collapse of the imperial order and the establishment of the Republic of China in 1912, he remained loyal to the Qing dynasty and served as tutor and adviser of the former emperor, Puyi, who was allowed to stay in the Forbidden City for more than thirteen years under the "Articles of Favorable Treatment." In 1917, Chen supported the Manchu Restoration, the loyalist general Zhang Xun's abortive attempt to restore the Qing dynasty. Chen Baochen continued to serve Puyi after he was finally expelled from the Forbidden City in 1924, but unlike his rival Zheng Xiaoxu, he refused to collaborate in the establishment of Manchukuo.

Victor Wong portrayed Chen in the 1987 feature film, The Last Emperor.

Further reading
Aisin-Gioro Puyi. From Emperor to Citizen: The Autobiography of Aisin-Gioro Pu Yi. Translated by W.J.F. Jenner. Peking: Foreign Languages Press, 2002. .

External links
Calligraphy by Chen Baochen
BaoChen Chen's calligraphic couplet

Qing dynasty politicians from Fujian
Politicians from Fuzhou
Imperial tutors in Qing dynasty
1848 births
1935 deaths